Esmeraldas is a province in northwestern Ecuador. The capital is Esmeraldas.

The province is home to the Afro-Ecuadorian culture.

Demographics 
Ethnic groups as of the Ecuadorian census of 2010:
Mestizo  44.7%
Afro-Ecuadorian  43.9%
White  5.9%
Indigenous  2.8%
Montubio  2.4%
Other  0.3%

Governance 
The province has a governor who is appointed by the President. In 2013 Paola Cabezas was appointed as the Governor by President Rafael Correa. She served for three years until she resigned and she was succeeded by Gabriel Rivera López who was also appointed by President Correa.

Cantons 
The province is divided into 7 cantons. The following table lists each with its population at the time of the 2001 census, its area in square kilometres (km2), and the name of the canton seat or capital.

Parroquias (Parishes) 
The cantons are divided into many parroquias:

In Muisne:
 Bellavista
 Daule
 Maldonado
 Muisne
 Pedro Carlo
 Tola
 Union of Daule

See also 
 Cantons of Ecuador
 Provinces of Ecuador
 Mompiche

References 

 
Afro-Ecuadorian
Provinces of Ecuador